Sternitta goateri is a moth of the family Erebidae first described by Michael Fibiger in 2011. It is found in Nuristan Province of Afghanistan.

The wingspan is 10.5–12 mm. The forewings are unicolorous light grey, but dark grey at the base of the costa and in the upper medial area. The crosslines are brown, including the interveinal dots that indicate the terminal line. The hindwing ground colour is whitish and the abdomen is whitish grey.

References

Micronoctuini
Taxa named by Michael Fibiger
Moths described in 2011